The Legendary Siblings 2 (also known as Amazing Twins) is a Taiwanese television series starring Jimmy Lin and Tae in the leading roles. It was first broadcast on CTS in Taiwan from January to March 2002, and was preceded by The Legendary Siblings in 1999. The plot is adapted from Gu Long's novel Juedai Shuangjiao and is seen as a follow-up to the original story.

Plot
In a once peaceful decade, a mysterious man named Badao appeared among the pugilists of Central Plains. He mercilessly killed the entire troop with his sword fighting skills. Meanwhile, in Baihua Valley, Feng Wuque and Jiang Feiyu appeared to live peacefully with their wives and newborn sons. Then, a group of pugilists led by He Yuntian of Huashan Sect delivered the news and sought for their assistance to retaliate Badao. The two swordsmen left and fought Badao until Yue Longxuan appeared before them. It was later found out that Badao was forced to duel Feng Wuque and Jiang Feiyu in exchange of his family's life, but Yue Longxuan silenced him. Feng Wuque and Jiang Feiyu combined their strength and managed to defeat Yue Longxuan and died. In the meantime, their wives (Xiaofeng and Roulan) were chased by some pugilists and jumped off a cliff with their sons.

Twenty years later in Longyang Town, Xiaoyu, a young man who loves to play pranks and deceive people, lived as a young master to a big gambling house. On the other hand, Wuji grew up as a common woodcutter living with his parents in the outskirts. The two first met in a small shop where Xiaoyu was dining and Wuji supplied wood for the shop owner. Xiaoyu had a "familiar feeling" towards Wuji. Then, Wuji went home from work devastated as he discovered that his house was burnt and his parents were killed. He found a jade pendant which led him to the assumption that Xiaoyu murdered his parents and searched for him to avenge their death.

The Mingyue Palace was attacked by a group of Tianmen scouts but were single handedly killed by Mingyue, a formidable Chief known to the pugilists world. She then settled to leave her palace for a mission. While running for errands, Xiaoyu met and fought Wuji with a false claim that Xiaoyu murdered Wuji's parents. Wuji spared his life in an agreement that Xiaoyu should determine the real murderer in three months. Their investigation led them to Bu'er Manor linking a piece of evidence they found at Wuji's place. They left for Bu'er City and enlist in the manor's congregation however they needed a recommendation letter as recruits. They secured a letter from an elderly man, who happened to be the Chief Steward of Bu'er Manor. The two passed the registration and joined the strict selection process. After a series of tests, the two succeeded as Bu'er Manor's disciples, met the other entrants, Xiaojiang and Xueyu, and Chang Chun, a divine physician.

During their adventures, Xiaoyu and Wuji met an unnamed skilled swordsman, whom Ziyan was also pursuing. The swordsman looked like the legendary Yan Haotian, Mingyue's former lover. He was used by the Tianmen to lure Mingyue and dispose her since she was a threat to the Tianmen's chief's desire to dominate the pugilist arena. Her fight with the Tianmen sustained her injuries causing Chang Chun to save and cure her. Ziyan also found out that her juniors were massacred by a Tianmen cavalier and struggled to fight him. She was rescued by Xiaoyu and brought her to the manor to recuperate. While at the manor, Xiaoyu and Wuji learned of other mysteries within like headless ghosts, missing artisans, and explosions. Their investigations gave them the answers to secrets in Bu'er Manor - Chief Yuwen Pu is a branch leader of Tianmen. Chief Yuwen Pu intended to kill all the attendants on the day of the congregation and become one of the four main sects leader. A battle was ensued and everyone was locked inside the gathering hall fighting off a poisonous fume and Chief Yuwen Pu was assassinated by Xiaojiang and Xueyu but Wuji was mistakenly identified by Yuwen Shuang as her father's murderer. Meanwhile, Mingyue faced off Yue Longxuan, the Tianmen Chief, and was severely injured. At the manor, everyone was saved by a dying lady, Guo Roulan (Feng Wuque's wife), and revealed that Xiaoyu and Wuji were Jiang Feiyu's and Feng Wuque's sons respectively. This discovery led Chief He Yuntian of Huashan to adopt the two as his disciples and imparted his knowledge in martial arts.

Xiaoyu, Wuji, Ziyan, Dongwei, and Chang Chun left the city in search for Mingyue. The group stopped at Yi Lou, an establishment that trades almost anything, and found Mingyue who was caught with amnesia and served as a hostess with a new name (Xiaolan). Also, Yuwen Shuang was accepted by Zhu Xiaotong, Yi Lou's owner, and sold herself to whoever kills Wuji in her desperation to avenge her father's death. Mingyue's presence at Yi Lou has spread and steered every pugilist to execute her. The group managed to escape from their perpetrators and dwelt at the Evil Forest, where they stayed at Du Qiaoqiao's place. Xiaoyu met Du Qiaoqiao beforehand and is one of the Ten Evils and raised Jiang Feiyu. Zhu Xiaotong later revealed that she is Senior Xiaoyao, Mingyue's disciple, but betrayed her master because of love. The group remained at the Evil Forest until help arrived. While at the forest, Wuji took Yuwen Shuang as his disciple and taught her his sword fighting skills to execute him as a pact they agreed upon whilst Xiaoyu was hypnotized to kill Mingyue/Xiaolan. Xiaoyu's hypnotic state was Du Qiaoqiao's ploy and is apparently a Tianmen branch leader. Xiaoyu, Wuji, and Chang Chun fled the forest to awaken Mingyue's/Xiaolan's power whereas Ziyan, Dongwei, and Yuwen Shuang were captured by Yue Longxuan as bait. Dongwei sacrificed herself with a divine crystal injuring the Tianmen. Chief He Yuntian arrived in time and managed to drive Yue Longxuan and his men.

Ziyan went missing for three months but eventually reunites with Xiayou as he and Wuji searched for Xueyu to retrieve the Tianmen Token. They eventually captured her but was later rescued by Xiaojiang. Again, Xiaoyu was poisoned and helpless as mysteries arise. Yuwen Shuang has forgotten about her hate and revenge towards Wuji. In a while, Chief He Yuntian was revealed to be the man behind the conspiracies and he was in fact Ziyan's father. Xiaoyu's intelligent skills lured He Yuntian into fighting Yue Longxuan, killing him. The shocking revelation caused Xiaoyu's and Ziyan's breakup. With the Huashan Sect's downfall, Wuji was elected as its new chief.

Few months have passed, Xiaojiang announced his treachery with Tianmen and joined forces with Wuji and Xiaoyu at the Golden Eagle Fort under Chief Ye Tianzhao's guidance. Wuji was chosen as the forerunner in directing the pugilists to take down Tianmen. The death of the Winter Threesome, appearance of Duan Tianbao, abduction of Yuwen Shuang, disownment of Xueyu from Tianmen, and the truth behind Xiaojiang's and Wuji's identity caused an uproar at the Golden Eagle Fort and the pugilist arena. At the same time, Ziyan has welcomed Buddhism and decided to become a nun, Wuji has announced his marriage to Yuwen Shuang, and Luo Yunbing/Madam Bing consulted Chang Chun for treatment. After a battle at the fort, Xueyu pleaded for Yue Longxuan's mercy and rejoin Tianmen. She was accepted and initiated her plot against her foster father in attempt to avenge Xiaojiang's supposed death. After a series of events, Xiaoyu decided to undergo training and discipleship under Yao Haotian. In place of Yao Haotian, he was trained by Yan Piaoxiang, Yan Haotian's grand niece, at the Flower Palace. Once more, Xiaoyu reconciled with Ziyan through Yan Piaoxiang's aid. Wuji's relationship with Yue Longxuan caused him to step down as a chief and lived as a commoner. He found Yuwen Shuang, who was reluctant to see him as she feared he might not accept her because of her disfigured face after a tragic fate. Still, Wuji accepted her and lived with her in a farmland.

The Tianmen attacked the Golden Eagle Fort leaving the main characters alive. Mingyu's duel against Yue Longxuan caused her death which shattered Chang Chun, refusing to leave her grave. The remaining survivors (Madam Bing, Duan Tianbao, Boss Yu, Ziyan, Xueyu, and an aide) traveled to Evil Forest to recruit more pugilists to continue their rally against Yue Longxuan. There, they were reunited with Wuji and Yuwen Shuang and the couple were shortly married. After the wedding ceremony, Yuwen Shuang was kidnapped and Xiaojiang appeared to save the group. Wuji was then compelled to be with his father in exchange for Yuwen Shuang. A letter was sent out to challenge Xiaojiang, Feng Wuque's real son, and Xiaoyu to a duel against Wuji. They had an intense fight but Wuji was seen as the victor. Witnessing this, Yue Longxuan was proud of his son's achievement but he was enraged when Xiaoyu revealed himself disguised as Wuji. As the combat continued, Xiaoyu was saved by Madam Bing's and Duan Tianbao's tandem. Madam Bing soon exposed herself as Yue Longxuan's wife and Wuji's biological mother. Yue Longxuan begged for his wife's forgiveness as his actions led him in misery. As Madam Bing was about to give in, Yue Longxuan assaulted her but Wuji blocked his attack, severely injuring him. This infuriated Yue Longxuan and he was bound by guilt driving him mad. At the end, Wuji accepted his fate as Yue Longxuan's son but chose the path of righteousness thanking Xiaoyu and the rest of the gang.

Cast

 Jimmy Lin as Xiaoyu / Jiang Feiyu
 Tae as Wuji
 Li Xiaolu as Ziyan
 Tien Hsin as Yuwen Shuang
 Lawrence Ng as Chang Chun
 Yu Li as Mingyue
 Zheng Guolin as Xiaojiang
 Chang Jui-chu as Xueyu
 Vivi Ho as Doudou
 Shadow Liu as Dongwei
 Elvis Tsui as Boss Yu
 Michael Huang as Yan Haotian
 Wang Tao as Yue Longxuan
 Huang Chun-lung as Duan Tianbao
 Ku Kuan-chung as Yuwen Pu
 Chen Kuan-tai as Ye Tianzhao
 Tien Niu as Zhu Xiaotong
 Zhu Yan as Red Chili
 Yang Tze-chung as He Yuntian
 Ge Lei as Wang Yanniang
 You Ya as Mo Bing
 Jin Qiaoqiao as Guo Ruolan
 Stephanie Hsiao as Yan Piaoxiang
 Yue Yueli
 Dai Chunrong

Guest stars
 Alec Su as Feng Wuque
 Steve Ma as Badao

Characters
 Xiaoyu

Xiaoyu is one of the main protagonist of the series. He shares the same appearance like his biological father, Jiang Feiyu. He was first showed as a playful individual who loves to put on pranks and deceive people. As a young master and heir of Boss Yu's gambling house, he is a cunning martial artist. He may not be as skillful as Wuji but his intelligence, confidence, and inquisitive skills have saved him and his friends for several occasions. However, later in the series, he displayed great strength and power, which made him a formidable fighter himself. He acquired his skills from different masters, He Yuntian and Yan Piaoxiang, including Xiaojiang who also imparted his knowledge to Xiaoyu.

He is a loyal friend and has a word of honor, which he displayed in almost every episode. He befriends almost anyone he met, making every foe his ally. This is true for Wuji, who wanted to assassinate him for revenge at the beginning of the series, and Xiaojiang, a former Tianmen cavalier. Although Xiaoyu showed great allegiance to his companions, he is a softie making him weak and created conflict especially with women. He was also known as a heart breaker and he was easily devastated after the death of Doudou, his childhood friend, and absence of Ziyan.

Xiaoyu has a deep brotherly relationship with Wuji whom he met after an unexpected fate. Their bonds grew stronger as sworn brothers after their discovery as Jiang Feiyu's and Feng Wuque's sons. Their connection enabled them to defeat Yue Longxuan at the end of the series. Meanwhile, Ziyan was the only person who can control his attitude and fight him by provoking her. A series of events indicated their budding romance, which was also noticed by their companions, but Xiaoyu denied the fact and told them he decided to never fall in love again after Doudou's death. When he was hypnotized by Du Qiaoqiao, Ziyan confessed and he replied her by telling Ziyan he loved her. After uncovering the traitor, Xiayou felt guilty into tricking Ziyan. He later realized his feelings for Ziyan when she went missing for three months. This caused him desolated and started collecting purple items to remind him of Ziyan. On the second time they separated, Xiaoyu submitted into drinking and calling her name when asleep. He feared that he might not see Ziyan again once she became a full pledged nun. He kept a terrapin as a pet, a keepsake from Ziyan, and called her his "wife" on few instances.

 Wuji

Wuji, another main protagonist of the story, was raised by a couple of woodcutters in the outskirts of Longyang Town. For a year, he secretly learned sword fighting through a manual and a sword he found in the forest. He is a strong and skillful fighter despite his innocence, shyness, and calm attitude. He is a fast learner by merely observing his opponent, making him a fearsome opponent. This is evident when He Yuntian showed his skills for Wuji and Xiaoyu as well as when he faced off the masked black fighter (who was He Yuntian himself). His great fighting skills led him as the new Huashan Chief and the main leader against Tianmen. Wuji is the biological son of Yue Longxuan, Tianmen's chief, and Luo Yunbing/Madam Bing.

Like Xiaoyu, he is a devoted friend and a warm person. His sincerity changed Yuwen Shuang's and Duan Tianbao's impressions of him. He is very compassionate especially with Yuwen Shuang. They were well acquainted at the beginning particularly when Xiaoyu rejected Yuwen Shuang but their friendship ended as Yuwen Shuang thought Wuji murdered her father. Later on, Wuji willingly agreed on taking her as his disciple and taught her his skills to accomplish Yuwen Shuang's desire to kill him. After the battle at the Evil Forest, the two parted their ways. Eventually, Yuwen Shuang's hatred grew into love for Wuji. Their love-hate relationship ended up in marriage.

Wuji's discovery as Yue Longxuan's son and heir to the Tianmen throne led him step down from his position as chief. He lived as a commoner, working at the riverside under a rice merchant, with the intention to save money, search for Yuwen Shuang, and settle in a quiet place. Wuji was drawn in complete confusion and hated his self as the son of Yue Longxuan. Although, the last episode showed that he accepted the fact but he still chose the right path instead of joining his father in his evil reign.

 Ziyan

Ziyan was known as an orphaned girl and was raised as a disciple in the Mingyue Palace. She is a strong and competent fighter herself, learning martial arts from Mingyue. She was first shown as a fierce warrior and can be easily provoked especially with Xiaoyu around her. Though, as the story progressed, Ziyan transformed from an innocent and feisty woman to a kind-hearted and amusing lady. She is the daughter of Chief He Yuntian, making her the young mistress of Huashan Sect, and Xiaoyu's romantic interest.

Xiaoyu was captivated by Ziyan's beauty when they first met and entertained her with his antics but Ziyan despised him. Her behavior towards him changed when Xiaoyu rescued her from Tianmen to avenge her sisters' death and took her to Bu'er Manor. In one episode, Xiaoyu and Ziyan accidentally kissed after a huge explosion at the manor. Ziyan was the only person who can manipulate Xiaoyu. Their developing romantic relationship was remarked by their companions yet the two refused the fact. In another event, Ziyan confessed while Xiaoyu was hypnotized, who responded her feelings. Unknown to Ziyan, it was an act to lure the traitor in their group and this made her believe that what Xiaoyu said were lies. Her absence, however, made Xiaoyu realize his affection towards her. They were eventually reunited but their relationship ended after Xiaoyu revealed her betrayal and link to He Yuntian. Ziyan ended up as novice in practicing Buddhism and decided to become a nun. Boss Yu's, Xiaoyu's foster father, took all means to reunite the ex-lovers but their proud behavior prevented them to. Later on, Xiaoyu and Ziyan reconciled with Yan Piaoxiang's assistance. This led to Boss Yu's announcement that Ziyan will be Xiaoyu's future wife.

Ziyan liked the purple color and appeared to be good at menial chores like cooking (her specialty is braised pigeon), sewing, and cleaning.

 Yuwen Shuang

Yuwen Shuang (also known as Shuangshuang in the series) is the young mistress of Bu'er Manor, daughter of Chief Yuwen Pu, and Wuji's wife. She was brought up with riches, a spoiled daughter, and she can get anything she wants. Her status also made her a tough and skilled martial artist as well as known for her beauty and wits. An unfortunate event in her life caused her to depression and strong determination to kill Wuji after she watched her father's death in the hands of Wuji. But her hatred developed into love, acceptance, and maturity.

She was once infatuated with Xiaoyu and believed that she could get him to like her by chasing him. The two first met as Xiaoyu mistook Yuwen Shuang as a servant and started to like him. With her influence, she used the Chief Steward to give Xiaoyu and Wuji a recommendation letter in order to join the Bu'er Manor. Her efforts to win Xiaoyu's heart failed as Xiaoyu rejected her and treated her only as a friend. Heartbroken, Shuangshuang confided her despair on Wuji and began a friendly relationship. In an episode, Wuji accidentally landed on Shuangshuang while she was taking a bath, leaving a handkerchief with Xiayou's name embroidered on it. She believed that the culprit was Xiaoyu and not Wuji. Their friendship came to an end because of a false accusation regarding Yuwen Pu's death. Shuangshuang was determined to execute Wuji to the point she sold herself as a bride to any man who could destroy Wuji. Afterwards, Xiaoyu placed them in an agreement since he was always caught in the middle. The contract was that Wuji would pass on his skills to Shuangshuang and they are to fight on the first and fifteenth day of every month in a year. If Shuangshuang failed to defeat Wuji at a given time frame, she ought to forget her hatred and revenge. Wuji and Shuangshuang both agreed and Shuangshuang somehow beat Wuji but unable to fully kill her enemy.

After the incident at the Evil Forest, Shuangshuang settled in Huashan for three months. This gave her the time to think about her actions and past. She disclosed to Xiaoyu that she has forgotten about her revenge. Her feelings towards Wuji developed into love as they began to spend time together. Shuangshuang accepted Wuji's marriage proposal after his nomination as chief but their marriage was objected by Duan Tianbao, her former senior. Duan Tianbao abducted her to keep her from Wuji. Shuangshuang's face was burnt while she was locked and tried to escape from a burning hut. This resulted to her hesitation to reunite with Wuji as she feared that Wuji would never accept her. Nevertheless, Wuji married her.

External links
  The Legendary Siblings 2 official page on CTS's website

Taiwanese wuxia television series
Works based on Juedai Shuangjiao
Taiwanese television series
2002 Taiwanese television series debuts
2002 Taiwanese television series endings
Sequel television series
Television shows based on works by Gu Long